Mikhail Sokovin (Russian, Михаил Алексеевич Соковнин, 18 October 1863 – 1943) was an Imperial Russian army commander. He served in China and fought in the war against the Empire of Japan. He was promoted to polkovnik (colonel) in April 1902 and major general in April 1908.

Awards
Order of Saint Stanislaus (House of Romanov), 3rd class, 1893
Order of Saint Anna, 3rd class, 1896
Order of Saint Stanislaus (House of Romanov), 2nd class, 1899
Order of Saint Anna, 2nd class, 1900
Order of Saint Vladimir, 4th class, 1902
Order of Saint Vladimir, 3rd class (November 26, 1904)
Order of Saint Stanislaus (House of Romanov), 1st class (December 6, 1912)
Order of Saint Anna, 1st class, 1914
Order of Saint Vladimir, 2nd class, 1916
Order of the White Eagle (Russian Empire), 1917

References

External links
 Биография Соковнина М. А. на сайте «Хронос»

Russian military personnel of the Boxer Rebellion
Russian military personnel of the Russo-Japanese War
Russian military personnel of World War I
Recipients of the Order of Saint Stanislaus (Russian), 3rd class
Recipients of the Order of St. Anna, 3rd class
Recipients of the Order of Saint Stanislaus (Russian), 2nd class
Recipients of the Order of St. Anna, 2nd class
Recipients of the Order of St. Vladimir, 4th class
Recipients of the Order of St. Vladimir, 3rd class
Recipients of the Order of Saint Stanislaus (Russian), 1st class
Recipients of the Order of St. Anna, 1st class
Recipients of the Order of St. Vladimir, 2nd class
Recipients of the Order of the White Eagle (Russia)
1863 births
1943 deaths